The 2016 NCAA Division I men's basketball tournament involved 68 teams playing in a single-elimination tournament to determine the men's National Collegiate Athletic Association (NCAA) Division I college basketball national champion for the 2015–16 season. The 78th edition of the Tournament began on March 15, 2016, and concluded with the championship game on April 4 at NRG Stadium in Houston, Texas.

Upsets were the story of the first round of the Tournament; No. 15 seed Middle Tennessee upset No. 2 seed Michigan State in the biggest upset, just the eighth ever win for a No. 15 seed over a No. 2. At least one 9, 10, 11, 12, 13, 14, and 15 seed won a first-round game for the third time ever and the first time since 2013.

In the Final Four, Villanova defeated Oklahoma, while North Carolina defeated Syracuse (the "Cinderella team" of the tournament). Villanova then defeated North Carolina to win the championship on a three-point buzzer beater by Kris Jenkins. Pundits called the game one of the best in tournament history, going on to say this was one of the most competitive finals ever.

Schedule and venues

Previously, the round of 64 was known as the second round since the 2011 edition, but it was reverted to the moniker first round for this coming tournament. The first four was previously named the first round.

First four
March 15 and 16
University of Dayton Arena, Dayton, Ohio (Host: University of Dayton)

First and second rounds
March 17 and 19
  Dunkin' Donuts Center, Providence, Rhode Island (Host: Providence College)
 Wells Fargo Arena, Des Moines, Iowa, (Host: Iowa State University)
 PNC Arena, Raleigh, North Carolina, (Host: North Carolina State University)
 Pepsi Center, Denver, Colorado, (Host: Mountain West Conference)
March 18 and 20
 Barclays Center, Brooklyn, New York, (Host: Atlantic 10 Conference)
 Scottrade Center, St. Louis, Missouri, (Host: Missouri Valley Conference)
 Chesapeake Energy Arena, Oklahoma City, Oklahoma, (Host: Big 12 Conference) 
 Spokane Veterans Memorial Arena, Spokane, Washington, (Host: University of Idaho)

Regional semifinals and finals (Sweet Sixteen and Elite Eight)
March 24 and 26
South Regional, KFC Yum! Center, Louisville, Kentucky, (Host: University of Louisville)
West Regional, Honda Center, Anaheim, California, (Host: Big West Conference)
March 25 and 27
East Regional, Wells Fargo Center, Philadelphia, Pennsylvania, (Host: La Salle University)
Midwest Regional, United Center, Chicago, (Host: Big Ten Conference)

National semifinals and championship (Final Four and championship)
April 2 and 4
NRG Stadium, Houston, Texas (Hosts: Rice University, Texas Southern University, University of Houston)

Qualifying and selection procedure 

Out of 336 eligible Division I teams, 68 participate in the tournament. Of the total, 15 Division I teams were ineligible due to failing to meet APR requirements, self-imposed postseason bans, or reclassification from a lower division.

Of the 32 automatic bids, 31 were given to programs that won their conference tournaments. For the final time, the Ivy League awarded its NCAA Tournament bid to the team with the best regular-season record and did not hold a tournament (unless playoffs games were needed to resolve tied champions). The Ivy League will hold a postseason tournament for the first time after the 2016–17 Ivy League season. The remaining 36 bids were granted on an "at-large" basis, which were extended by the NCAA Selection Committee to the teams it deems to be the best 36 teams that did not receive automatic bids.

Eight teams—the four lowest-seeded automatic qualifiers and the four lowest-seeded at-large teams—played in the First Four (the successor to what had been popularly known as "play-in games" through the 2010 tournament). The winners of these games advanced to the first round (round of 64). The Selection Committee also seeded the entire field from 1 to 68.

Automatic qualifiers
The following teams were automatic qualifiers for the 2016 NCAA field by virtue of winning their conference's automatic bid:

Tournament seeds

*See First Four

Bracket
All times are listed as Eastern Daylight Time (UTC−4)
* – Denotes overtime period

First Four – Dayton, Ohio
The First Four games involved eight teams: the four overall lowest-ranked teams, and the four lowest-ranked at-large teams.

South Regional – Louisville, Kentucky

South Regional Final

South Regional all tournament team
Kris Jenkins (Jr, Villanova) – South Regional most outstanding player
Ryan Arcidiacono (Sr, Villanova)
Josh Hart (Jr, Villanova)
Daniel Ochefu (Sr, Villanova)
Devonte' Graham (So, Kansas)

West Regional – Anaheim, California

West Regional Final

West Regional all tournament team
Buddy Hield (Sr, Oklahoma) – West Regional most outstanding player
Isaiah Cousins (Sr, Oklahoma)
Jordan Woodard (Jr, Oklahoma)
Elgin Cook (Sr, Oregon)
Brandon Ingram (Fr, Duke)

East Regional – Philadelphia, Pennsylvania

East Regional Final

East Regional all tournament team
Brice Johnson (Sr, North Carolina) – East Regional most outstanding player
Marcus Paige (Sr, North Carolina)
V. J. Beachem (Jr, Notre Dame)
Demetrius Jackson (Jr, Notre Dame)
Yogi Ferrell (Sr, Indiana)

Midwest Regional – Chicago, Illinois

Midwest Regional Final

Midwest Regional all tournament team

Malachi Richardson (Fr, Syracuse) – Midwest Regional most outstanding player
Michael Gbinije (Sr, Syracuse)
London Perrantes (Jr, Virginia)
Georges Niang (Sr, Iowa State)
Domantas Sabonis (So, Gonzaga)

Final Four
During the Final Four round, regardless of the seeds of the participating teams, the champion of the top overall top seed's region (Kansas's South Region) plays against the champion of the fourth-ranked top seed's region (Oregon's West Region), and the champion of the second overall top seed's region (North Carolina's East Region) plays against the champion of the third-ranked top seed's region (Virginia's Midwest Region).

NRG Stadium – Houston, Texas

Final Four

The Villanova–Oklahoma result was not only the most one-sided in the tournament so far, but also in the history of the men's Final Four. The Wildcats shot 71.4% for the game, surpassed in Final Four games only by the Wildcats' 78.6% performance in the 1985 final against Georgetown. The 44-point margin was also greater than the combined margin of defeat in Oklahoma's seven previous losses in 2015–16. In addition, the 2016 semifinals were the first since 2008 to both be decided by double-digit margins, and the combined 61-point margin broke a men's Final Four record set in 1949.

National Championship

The Wildcats' Championship run was the 2nd most dominant in NCAA Tournament history, with a total point differential of +124 (see Kentucky 1996, +129) (breaking the 2009 record set by the North Carolina Tar Heels of +121).

Final Four all-tournament team
 Ryan Arcidiacono (Sr, Villanova) – Final Four Most Outstanding Player
 Josh Hart (Jr, Villanova)
 Phil Booth (So, Villanova)
 Joel Berry II (So, North Carolina)
 Brice Johnson (Sr, North Carolina)

Tournament notes
America East Conference champion Stony Brook and WAC champion Cal State Bakersfield made their first NCAA Tournament appearances in school history.

Yale made its first NCAA appearance since 1962 as winners of the Ivy League, which, for the final time, did not stage a conference tournament. Of those that do hold a tournament, Horizon League champion Green Bay made its first appearance since 1996 and Oregon State made its first appearance since 1990.

Yale also earned its first Tournament win in school history with a 79–75 win over Baylor. Hawaii likewise earned its first NCAA Tournament win by defeating California 77–66. Arkansas-Little Rock won its first Tournament game in 30 years and Middle Tennessee won its first Tournament game in 27 years.

In the Midwest Region, No. 15 seed Middle Tennessee upset No. 2 seed Michigan State for just the eighth ever win for a No. 15 seed over a No. 2.  More than one-third of ESPN Tournament Challenge brackets predicted Michigan State to make the Final Four.

In the East Region, No. 14 seed Stephen F. Austin upset No. 3 seed West Virginia, marking the fourth straight tournament in which a No. 14 seed upset a No. 3 seed.

By winning the Midwest Regional final, Syracuse became the first No. 10 seed in history to advance to the Final Four. However, four lower seeds, all No. 11, have advanced to that stage (in 1986, 2006, 2011, and  2021).

Kansas extended its streak of consecutive tournament appearances to 27 in a row, making every NCAA Tournament dating back to 1990. This tied the record for most consecutive NCAA Tournament appearances held by North Carolina (1975–2001).

This Tournament marked the first championship for Villanova in 31 years. It was also the first championship by a school without a Division I FBS football team since Connecticut in 1999. Villanova fields a Division I FCS football team, as did UConn before 2002.

Upsets
Per the NCAA, "Upsets are defined as when the winner of the game was seeded five or more places lower than the team it defeated." The 2016 tournament saw a total of 11 upsets; 8 of them were in the first round, 2 of them were in the second round, none in the Sweet Sixteen, and one in the Elite Eight.

Record by conference

The R64, R32, S16, E8, F4, CG, and NC columns indicate how many teams from each conference were in the round of 64 (first round), round of 32 (second round), Sweet 16, Elite Eight, Final Four, championship game, and national champion, respectively.
The "Record" column includes wins in the First Four for the Big Ten, Missouri Valley, Atlantic Sun, and Patriot conferences and losses in the First Four for the SEC and American conferences.
The NEC and SWAC each had one representative, both eliminated in the First Four with a record of 0–1.
The America East, Big Sky, Big South, CAA, Horizon, MAAC, MAC, MEAC, Mountain West, Ohio Valley, Southern, Summit, and WAC conferences each had one representative, eliminated in the first round with a record of 0–1.

Media coverage

Television
CBS Sports and Turner Sports held joint U.S. television broadcast rights to the Tournament under the NCAA March Madness brand. Beginning in 2016, rights to the Final Four and championship game began to alternate between Turner and CBS, with Turner networks broadcasting the 2016 Final Four and championship; a conventional telecast aired on TBS, accompanied by "Team Stream" broadcasts on TNT and TruTV which featured commentary and coverage focused on each participating team. Turner employed this multi-channel presentation of the semifinals in 2014 and 2015, but this was the first time it was used for the final. It marked the first time in tournament history that the national championship game aired on cable channels, and ended CBS' streak of broadcasting 34 consecutive National Championship games. However, Turner allowed the tournament's closing theme, One Shining Moment, to be played for the 30th year in a row. To date, the song is still played in this manner, no matter which network airs the National Championship game.

For 2016, the selection show on CBS was expanded into a two-hour broadcast—a move which proved unpopular with viewers due to the decreased speed at which the participating teams were unveiled. These issues were exacerbated by a leak of the full bracket shortly into the broadcast, which spread on Twitter. Although ratings for the selection show had steadily decreased over the past four years, the 3.7 overnight rating for the broadcast was the lowest in 20 years. CBS Sports chairman Sean McManus admitted that the extended special was a failure, stating that "we haven't had any specific discussions but I think we all agree it would serve all of us well including the fan to release the brackets in a little more timely manner".

Studio hosts
Greg Gumbel (New York City and Houston) – First round, second round, Regionals, Final Four and National Championship Game
Ernie Johnson Jr. (New York City, Atlanta, and Houston) – First round, second round, Regional Semi-Finals, Final Four and National Championship Game
Matt Winer (Atlanta) – First Four, First Round and Second Round

Studio analysts
Charles Barkley (New York City and Houston) – First round, second round, Regionals, Final Four and National Championship Game
Swin Cash (Atlanta) – First Four
Seth Davis (Atlanta and Houston) – First Four, first round, second round, Regional Semi-Finals, Final Four and National Championship Game
Johnny Dawkins (New York City) – Second Round
Doug Gottlieb (New York City) – Regionals
Ron Hunter (Atlanta) – First round
Clark Kellogg (New York City and Houston) – First round, second round, Regionals, Final Four and National Championship Game
Reggie Miller (Houston) – Final Four and National Championship Game
Kenny Smith (New York City and Houston) – First round, second round, Regionals, Final Four and National Championship Game
Steve Smith (Houston) – Final Four and National Championship Game
Kevin Stallings (Atlanta) – Second Round
Wally Szczerbiak (Atlanta) – First Four, first round, second round and Regional Semi-Finals
Buzz Williams (Atlanta) – Regional Semi-Finals

Commentary teams
Jim Nantz/Bill Raftery/Grant Hill/Tracy Wolfson/Craig Sager – First and Second Rounds at Des Moines, Iowa; South Regional at Louisville, Kentucky; Final Four and National Championship at Houston
 Sager joined Nantz, Raftery, Hill, and Wolfson for the Championship Game to interview Michael Jordan
Brian Anderson/Steve Smith/Dana Jacobson – First and Second Rounds at St. Louis, Missouri; East Regional at Philadelphia, Pennsylvania
Verne Lundquist/Jim Spanarkel/Allie LaForce – First and Second Rounds at Brooklyn, New York; West Regional at Anaheim, California
Kevin Harlan/Reggie Miller/Dan Bonner/Lewis Johnson – First and Second Rounds at Raleigh, North Carolina; Midwest Regional at Chicago
Ian Eagle/Chris Webber/Len Elmore/Evan Washburn – First and Second Rounds at Providence, Rhode Island
Spero Dedes/Doug Gottlieb/Rosalyn Gold-Onwude – First and Second Rounds at Spokane, Washington
Andrew Catalon/Steve Lappas/Jamie Erdahl – First Four at Dayton, Ohio (Tuesday); First and Second Rounds at Denver, Colorado
Carter Blackburn/Mike Gminski/Jaime Maggio – First Four at Dayton, Ohio (Wednesday); First and Second Rounds at Oklahoma City.

Team Stream broadcasts
Final Four
Chad McKee/Eduardo Nájera/Jessica Coody – Oklahoma Team Stream on TNT
Scott Graham/Brian Finneran/Kacie McDonnell – Villanova Team Stream on truTV
Wes Durham/Brendan Haywood/Dwayne Ballen – North Carolina Team Stream on TNT
Tom Werme/Roosevelt Bouie/Donovan McNabb – Syracuse Team Stream on truTV
National Championship Game
Wes Durham/Brendan Haywood/Dwayne Ballen – North Carolina Team Stream on TNT
Scott Graham/Brian Finneran/Kacie McDonnell – Villanova Team Stream on truTV

Radio
Westwood One had exclusive radio rights to the entire tournament.

First Four
Craig Way and Kevin Grevey – at Dayton, Ohio

First and Second rounds
Scott Graham and Donny Marshall – Providence, Rhode Island
Brandon Gaudin and Mike Montgomery – Des Moines, Iowa
John Sadak and Eric Montross/John Thompson – Raleigh, North Carolina (Montross – Thursday afternoon; Thompson – Thursday night & Saturday)
Kevin Kugler and Jim Jackson – Denver, Colorado
Chris Carrino and Kelly Tripucka – Brooklyn, New York City, New York
Wayne Larrivee and Will Perdue – St. Louis, Missouri
Tom McCarthy and P. J. Carlesimo – Oklahoma City, Oklahoma
Kevin Calabro and Dan Dickau – Spokane, Washington

Regionals
Tom McCarthy and John Thompson – East Regional at Philadelphia, Pennsylvania
Gary Cohen and Jim Jackson – Midwest Regional at Chicago, Illinois
Ian Eagle and P. J. Carlesimo – South Regional at Louisville, Kentucky
Kevin Kugler and Donny Marshall – West Regional at Anaheim, California

Final Four
Kevin Kugler, John Thompson, Clark Kellogg, and Jim Gray – Houston, Texas

Local radio

Internet
The games were streamed on the NCAA March Madness Live website and app, with streams for Turner games also available on the Bleacher Report website and Team Stream app, and CBS games available on the CBS Sports website and app.
Games on TBS were available on Watch TBS app. Games on TNT were made available on Watch TNT app. Games on TruTV were available on Watch TruTV app. Westwood One's radio broadcasts, including a "National Mix" channel consisting of whip-around coverage during the first and second rounds, was available on its website and on the TuneIn app.

The games were also viewable on the PlayStation 3, PlayStation 4, PlayStation Vita and Xbox One video game consoles via the PlayStation Vue (PS3/PS4; all games), Sling TV (XB1; TBS, TNT, TruTV games) and TuneIn (Vita/XB1; all games) apps.

See also
 2016 NCAA Division II men's basketball tournament
 2016 NCAA Division III men's basketball tournament
 2016 NCAA Division I women's basketball tournament
 2016 NCAA Division II women's basketball tournament
 2016 NCAA Division III women's basketball tournament
 2016 National Invitation Tournament
 2016 Women's National Invitation Tournament
 2016 NAIA Division I men's basketball tournament
 2016 NAIA Division II men's basketball tournament
 2016 NAIA Division I women's basketball tournament
 2016 NAIA Division II women's basketball tournament
 2016 College Basketball Invitational
 2016 CollegeInsider.com Postseason Tournament
 2016 Vegas 16 Tournament

Notes
1.The 15 teams that were ineligible, and the reasons for ineligibility:
 Academic Progress Rate
 Alcorn State
 Central Arkansas
 Florida A&M
 Stetson
 Other NCAA infractions
 SMU
 Self-imposed bans
 Louisville
 Missouri
Cal State Northridge
Pacific
 Southern Miss
 Reclassification
 Abilene Christian
 Grand Canyon
 Incarnate Word
 UMass Lowell
 Northern Kentucky

References

NCAA tournament
NCAA Division I men's basketball tournament
Basketball in Houston
March 2016 sports events in the United States
April 2016 sports events in the United States
2016 in sports in Texas
2016 in Houston